Abū ʿUthmān Abān ibn Marwān ibn al-Ḥakam was an Umayyad prince and governor.

Life
Aban was the son of the Umayyad caliph Marwan I and Umm Aban al-Kubra, a daughter of the third caliph, Uthman. Aban's half-brother, Abd al-Malik, appointed him, for an undetermined period, governor of Palestine and the Balqa subdistrict of Damascus. According to the historian Moshe Gil, Aban was later made governor of Jordan. Al-Hajjaj ibn Yusuf, one of the most powerful figures in the Umayyad Caliphate as viceroy of Iraq and the eastern provinces, started his career in the shurta (security forces) of Aban. Aban was married to Zaynab bint Abd al-Rahman, a granddaughter of the commander al-Harith ibn Hisham of the Banu Makhzum clan. She gave birth to Aban's children, but they are not named in the sources.

References

Bibliography

7th-century Arabs
Sons of Umayyad caliphs
Umayyad governors of Palestine
Umayyad governors of Jordan